Lois Morrison (b. 1934 Belgian Congo now the Democratic Republic of the Congo) is an American book artist. She attended Mary Baldwin College, Indiana University Bloomington, and Virginia Commonwealth University. On several occasions she has collaborated with fellow book artist Julie Chen, including the 2017 volume A recuerdo for Ste. Ostrich.

Her artist's books are in the Smithsonian Libraries and Archives, the Joseph C. Sloane Art Library Collection of Artists’ Books and Zines at UNC, the School of the Art Institute of Chicago Library & Special Collections,  and the National Museum of Women in the Arts.

References

External links
 Julie Chen and Lois Morrison with Sandra Kroupa at the Bainbridge Island Museum of Art

1934 births
Living people
Women book artists
20th-century American women artists
Mary Baldwin University alumni
Virginia Commonwealth University alumni
Indiana University Bloomington alumni
Belgian Congo people